Oran is a masculine given name and a surname. People with the name include:

Given name

First name
Oran of Iona (died 548), Irish saint
Oran Wendle Eagleson (1910–1997), American psychologist
Oran Etkin (born 1979), Israeli musician
Oran Faville (1817–1872), American politician
Oran Follett (1798–1894), American politician
Oran K. Gragson (1911–2002), American politician
Oran Henderson (1920–1998), American military officer
Oran B. Hesterman, American agronomist
Oran Jackson (born 1998), English football player
Oran "Juice" Jones (born 1957), American singer
Oran Kearney (born 1978), Northern Irish professional football player and manager
Oran McPherson (1886–1949), Canadian politician
Oran Thaddeus Page, known as Hot Lips Page (1908–1954), American jazz musician
Oran Pape (1904–1936), American football player and police officer
Oran Milo Roberts (1815–1898), American politician

Middle name
Luis Orán Castañeda (1979—2020), Colombian road cyclist

Surname
Ahmet Cevdet Oran (1862–1935), Turkish journalist
Bülent Oran (1924–2004), Turkish screenwriter
Elaine Oran (born 1944), American scientist
María Orán (1943–2018), Spanish soprano
Narcisco Orán (born 1953), Panamanian weightlifter
Tom Oran (1847–1886), American baseball player
Umut Oran (born 1962), Turkish politician

Turkish-language surnames